The 27th Separate Guards Sevastopol Red Banner Motor Rifle Brigade "60th Anniversary of the USSR" is a tactical formation of the Russian Ground Forces. Its Military Unit Number (V/Ch) is 61899 (military unit 61899). It is part of 1st Guards Tank Army of the Western Military District, stationed in Mosrentgen, Novomoskovsky Administrative Okrug of Moscow.

History
The brigade traces its origins to the 535th Rifle Regiment, formed in the city of Chugueve of Kharkov Oblast in July 1940. From August 8, 1941 to September 14, 1941, the regiment, part of the  127th Rifle Division, participated in battles near Yelnya. On September 18, 1941, for the courage and valor of its personnel, the regiment and the remainder of the division became a Guards unit, the division becoming the 2nd Guards Rifle Division.

Atamyrat Niyazov, the father of the first post-Soviet President of Turkmenistan Saparmurat Niyazov, reportedly volunteered to go to the front with the 535th Rifle Regiment during World War II. According to post-Soviet official Turkmen sources, surrounding his son's personality cult, he was killed on 24 December 1942 during the Battle of the Caucasus.

The unit served as the 404th Guards Motorised Rifle Regiment (404th GMRR) from 1957 until the early 1980s, and in 1982 was given the honorific title "named for the 60th anniversary of the Union of Soviet Socialist Republics", celebrated that year.

After many years of service as a regiment, the brigade was activated when on 1 June 1983, in Teplyy Stan, Moscow Oblast, the 27th Guards Motor Rifle Brigade was established from the former 404th GMRR. It was briefly transferred to the Soviet Border Troops in 1990-91 before reverted to army control.

It is now part of the reformed 1st Guards Tank Army after 2014. The brigade was deployed in the 2022 Russian invasion of Ukraine for the occupation of Kharkiv Oblast, participating in the Battle of Izium. Reportedly during the retreat of the brigade following the recapture of Izium by Ukrainian forces, commanding officer Colonel Sergey Igorevich Safonov and another officer had stabbed an elderly woman and shot her husband respectively, killing both.

Composition

 Directorate
 1st Motorized Rifle Battalion
 2nd Motorized Rifle Battalion
 3rd Motorized Rifle Battalion
 Tank Battalion
 Self-Propelled Artillery Division
 Rocket Artillery Division
 Anti-Aircraft Missile and Artillery Division
 Intelligence Company
 Rifle Company 
 Signals Battalion
 Battalion of Material Support
 Repair and Restoration Company
 Engineering Company
 Commandant's Company
 NBC Company
 Medical Company
 Battery Management and Artillery Intelligence 
 Command and Radar Deconnaissance Platoon
 Management Platoon
 Platoon of Instructors
 Simulators Platoon
 Polygon
 Brigade Band

Band

The Military Band (currently led by Lieutenant Alexei Bozhedomov) is a specialized unit group in the brigade. It is deployed in the village of Mosrentgen in Moscow. It conducts active cultural accompaniment to all events of the brigade and at cultural events in Moscow. It is a regular participant in the Moscow Victory Day Parade on Red Square. The band is participated in the Spasskaya Tower Military Music Festival and Tattoo from 2017-2019.

Brigade commanders 

 Valentin Kryukov (June 1983 — August 1984)
 Gennady Andreev (August 1984 — August 1987)
 Pyotr Medvedev (August 1987 — July 1988)
 Boris Polyakov (July 1988 — June 1990)
 Alexander Yegorov (June 1990 — July 1993)
 Aleksandr Nikolayevich Denisov (July 1993 — February 1995)
 Sergey Generalov (February 1995 — April 1997)
 Alexey Samolkin (April 1997 — June 1999)
 Ivan Buvaltsev (July 1999 — July 2001)
 Alexander Kuzhilin (August 2001 — September 2003)
 Dmitry Yashin (November 2003 — October 2006)
 Aleksandr Chaiko (November 2006 — November 2007)
 Gennady Obukhov (December 2007 — December 2009)
 Andrey Trifonov (December 2009 — January 2012)
 Vladimir Yeremeyev (February 2012 — December 2013)
 Александр Семёнович Санчик (December 2013 — December 2014)
 Сергей Владимирович Горячев (December 2014 — November 2015)
 Dmitry Yakovlevich Aksyonov (November 2015 — July 2021)
 Colonel Sergey Igorevich Safonov (August 2021 — present)

Heroes of Russia 
Lieutenant Colonel of the Vladimir Belov
Lieutenant of the Guards Alexander Solomatin

External links 

 Общественный портал 27-я ОМСБр
 27-я отдельная гвардейская мотострелковая бригада (в/ч 61899)
 Описание боевых действий 2 гв. сд гв. генерал-майор Акименко А. З. — 1953 г.
 Система безопасности СССР
 Севастопольская мотострелковая бригада ЗВО усилила боевой состав гвардейской танковой армии

References 

Michael Holm, 27th independent Guards Sevastopolskaya Red Banner Motorised Rifle Brigade imeni 60th anniversary SSSR

Mechanised infantry brigades of Russia
Military units and formations established in 1983
Ground Forces brigades of the Soviet Union
Military units and formations of the Russo-Ukrainian War